Zollinger is a surname. Notable people with the surname include:

Albin Zollinger (1895–1941), Swiss writer
Charles A. Zollinger (1838–1893), American Civil War hero 
Friedrich Zollinger (1880–1945), German architect
Heinrich Zollinger (1818–1859), Swiss botanist
Janet Zollinger Giele (born 1934), American sociologist
Robert Zollinger (1903–1992), American surgeon
Rudi Zollinger (born 1944), Swiss cyclist
Sabrina Zollinger (born 1993), Swiss ice hockey player

German-language surnames